Brendan Murphy may refer to:

Sportspeople
 Brendan Murphy (Carlow footballer) (born 1989), and former international rules and Australian rules player
 Brendan Murphy (Meath footballer) (born 1975), also a former professional soccer player
 Brendan Murphy (Cork Gaelic footballer) (1921–2005), Irish Gaelic football player and administrator
 Brendan Murphy (hurler) (born 1980), Offaly hurler

Other people
 Brendan Murphy (doctor) (born 1955), Secretary of the Australian Department of Health and former chief medical officer 
 Brendan Murphy, lead vocalist of metal band Counterparts